The Bangladesh Baptist Fellowship (BBF) is a national cooperative association of Baptist churches in Bangladesh. It was formed in 1920 as the East Bengal Baptist Union. The BBF is today the largest Baptist body in Bangladesh.

A large majority of the congregations associated with the BBF was planted within the last decade and the BBF currently supports 10 evangelists who work in conjunction with churches to conduct evangelism in cities and remote villages.

Affiliations 

The BBF participates actively in ecumenical relationships through:
 National Christian Fellowship of Bangladesh
 Evangelical Fellowship of Asia
 World Evangelical Alliance
 Baptist World Alliance
 Asia Pacific Baptist Federation

See also 
 Asia Pacific Baptist Federation
 Baptist World Alliance

References 

Baptist Christianity in Bangladesh
Baptist denominations in Asia
Religious organizations established in 1886
1886 establishments in British India
Evangelical denominations in Asia